Pareclectis is a genus of moths in the family Gracillariidae.

Species
Pareclectis adelospila Vári, 1961
Pareclectis hobohmi Vári, 1961 
Pareclectis invita (Meyrick, 1912)
Pareclectis leucosticha Vári, 1961
Pareclectis mimetis Vári, 1961
Pareclectis prionota (Meyrick, 1928)

External links
Global Taxonomic Database of Gracillariidae (Lepidoptera)

Gracillariinae
Gracillarioidea genera